Mahmut Gazi Yaşargil (born 6 July 1925) is a Turkish medical scientist and neurosurgeon. He collaborated with Raymond M. P. Donaghy M.D at the University of Vermont in developing microneurosurgery. Yaşargil treated epilepsy and brain tumours with instruments of his own design. From 1953 until his retirement in 1993 he was first resident, chief resident and then professor and chairman of the Department of Neurosurgery, University of Zurich and the Zurich University Hospital. In 1999 he was honored as "Neurosurgery’s Man of the Century 1950–1999" at the Congress of Neurological Surgeons Annual Meeting.
He is a founding member of Eurasian Academy. He is regarded as one of the greatest neurosurgeons in the modern age.

Education and career

After attending Ankara Atatürk Lisesi and Ankara University in Ankara, Turkey between 1931 and 1943, he went to Germany to study medicine at the Friedrich Schiller University of Jena, Germany. His genius in developing microsurgical techniques for use in cerebrovascular neurosurgery transformed the outcomes of patients with conditions that were previously inoperable. In 1969 Yaşargil became associate professor and in 1973 professor and chairman of the Department of Neurosurgery, University of Zurich succeeding his mentor, Prof. Krayenbuhl. Over the next 20 years, he carried out laboratory work and clinical applications of micro techniques, performing 7500 intracranial operations in Zurich until his retirement in 1993.   In 1994, Yaşargil accepted  an appointment as Professor of Neurosurgery at the College of Medicine, University of Arkansas for Medical Sciences in Little Rock  where he is still active in the practice of micro-neurosurgery, research, and teaching.

Together with Harvey Cushing, Yaşargil is hailed as one of the greatest neurosurgeons of the twentieth century.  He has helped three generations of neurosurgeons, defining what is possible in neurosurgery, and then demonstrating how to achieve it. In the micro-neurosurgical anatomical laboratory in Zurich he trained around 3000 colleagues from all continents and representing all surgical specialties. He participated in several hundred national and international neurosurgical congresses, symposia, and courses as an invited guest. Yaşargil is in high regard in the Turkish society and is respected as an exemplary role model for Turkish youth.

He is married to Dianne Bader-Gibson Yaşargil, who was the nurse in charge of the operating suite by his side since 1973.

Publications
Yaşargil published his surgical experiences in 330 papers and 13 monographs. The six-volume publication Microneurosurgery (1984–1996, Georg Thieme Verlag Stuttgart-New York) is the comprehensive review of his broad experiences and a major contribution to the neurosurgery literature.

Membership
 1973–1975 President of the Neurosurgical Society of Switzerland

Awards
2000 Turkish State Medal of Distinguished Service
Marcel Benoist Prize-1975

References

External links 
M. Gazi Yasargil:Neurosurgery's Man of the Century. – biography article featured in Neurosurgery (journal). 45(5):1010, November 1999

1925 births
Living people
People from Lice, Turkey
Turkish neurosurgeons
People associated with the University of Zurich
Turkish medical researchers
Recipients of the State Medal of Distinguished Service
Recipients of TÜBİTAK Science Award
Honorary members of the Turkish Academy of Sciences
Turkish expatriates in Switzerland